Niamh McEvoy may refer to:

 Niamh McEvoy (Parnells Gaelic footballer)
 Niamh McEvoy (St. Sylvester's Gaelic footballer)